Bierzo is a Spanish Denominación de Origen Protegida (DOP) for wines located in the northwest of the province of León (Castile and León, Spain) and covers about 3,000 km². It borders on the provinces of Ourense, Lugo and Asturias in the north and in the south on areas of La Montaña, la Cabrera and La Meseta, in Léon.
The area consists of numerous small valleys in the mountainous part (Alto Bierzo) and of a wide, flat plain (Bajo Bierzo).
The DO covers 23 municipalities including the largest town of the area, Ponferrada (population about 70,000).

History

The first written reference to the Bierzo region, whose name derives from the pre-Roman city of Bergidum, is from Pliny the Elder. The Romans developed agriculture, introduced new crops including Vitis vinifera vines, and new technology such as the Roman plough. However, the greatest expansion of viticulture was related to the growth of the monasteries, especially the Cistercian order, during the Middle Ages.
After centuries of production and after having achieved a good reputation in the markets of Galicia and Asturias, the Bierzo vineyards suffered a terrible blow in the 19th century when the phylloxera plague practically wiped them out. There was a severe economic crisis which forced many people to emigrate.
Production was slowly re-established thanks to the technique of grafting onto new world rootstocks and wine production gradually recovered to assume the significant economic role it had played in the past. In 1989 the Bierzo Denominación de Origen was officially recognised.

Climate
The Bierzo DOP has a special macroclimate which is beneficial for viticulture. On the one hand it is similar to the climate of Galicia with regard to humidity and rainfall, and on the other it is also similar to the hot, dry climate of Castile. The low altitude also helps to prevent late frosts and means that the grape harvest is usually about one month earlier than in Castile.
The average annual temperature is around 12°C, with the minimum in winter of 3.5°C and maximum in summer of 24°C. The average annual rainfall is just over 700 mm, and the vines receive about 2,200 hours of sunshine per annum.

Soils
The soils in the mountains consist of a mixture of fine elements, quartz and slate. The vineyards are planted mainly on humid, dark soil which is slightly acidic and low in carbonates. The acidity ranges from 4 to 8.5, with values of over 6 in the valleys. Lime content is low, less than 3000 kg/ha. The carbon/nitrogen ratio is 11.9 in the valleys and 11 on the plains.

Grape varieties

The wines produced under the Bierzo DPO must be made only with the varieties that are authorised by the Consejo Regulador (Regulatory Council).
Red grapes: Mencía and Alicante Bouschet (Garnacha Tintorera).
White grapes: Doña Blanca, Godello, Palomino, and Malvasía.

Wines produced
 Young whites: Made with Doña Blanca, Godello and Palomino. Between 10° and 13°.
 Young reds: Made with a minimum of 70% Mencía. Between 11° and 14°.
 Aged wines without crianza: the vintage must be shown on the label and certain criteria complied with.
 Rosé wines: made with a minimum of 50% Mencía and may contain white grapes.
 Crianza wines: Minimum of 6 months in oak casks plus 18 months in the bottle.
 Reserva wines: Minimum of 12 months in oak barrels plus 24 months in the bottle for red wines; minimum of 6 months in oak casks and 18 months in the bottle for whites.

References

External links
 D.O. Bierzo official website

Wine regions of Spain
El Bierzo